Science fiction and fantasy in Estonia is largely a product of the current post-Soviet era.

Eesti Ulmeühing is an organization for print science fiction in Estonia that awards annual Stalker prizes. The awards are named after the Andrei Tarkovsky film Stalker that was largely shot in Estonia.

In film the works of Raul Tammet have been analyzed.

In the 1980s notable were two novels by Eiv Eloon (real name Lea Soo; born 1945): "Kaksikliik" ('Double Species'; 1981) and "Kaksikliik 2" ('Double Species 2'; 1988). These two novels were only works by Eloon.

A selection of Estonian writers who have won multiple Stalkers 
Veiko Belials

Indrek Hargla - Pen-name for Indrek Sootak, he also writes detective fiction that has been translated to English.
Leo Kunnas

The novel The Man Who Spoke Snakish by Andrus Kivirähk was awarded the Stalker award in 2008.

References

Further reading
 Andrus Org. Eesti ulmekirjanduse žanrid ja nende poeetika. (The Genre System of Estonian Fantastic Fiction and its Poetics, PhD thesis). Tartu: University of Tartu Press, 2017. (Dissertationes litterarum et contemplationis comparativae Universitatis Tartuensis 16.)
 Andrus Org. The Dimensions of the Contemporary Science Fiction Novel on the Basis of Examples from Estonian Literature. – Interlitteraria 2004, No 9, pp. 226–237.
 Andrus Org. Fantastic fiction in Estonian literature: fields of genres and their sources of influence. In: Martin Carayol (Ed.). Le fantastique et la science-fiction en Finlande et en Estonie. Paris: L'Harmattan, 2012, pp. 35–45. (Bibliothèque finno-ougrienne 23.)